Stefan Hula may refer to:
 Stefan Hula, Jr., Polish ski jumper
 Stefan Hula, Sr., Polish Nordic combined skier